The Skyscraper Tour was a North American, European, Japanese, and Australian concert tour by hard rock singer David Lee Roth.  It was his second ever solo concert tour, and is the only tour to have featured the line-up of Roth, Steve Vai, Matt Bissonette, Gregg Bissonette, and Brett Tuggle.

History
With the success of the Skyscraper album and "Just Like Paradise" single, an even more extensive tour than its predecessor (the Eat 'Em and Smile Tour) was embarked upon – this time visiting outside of just the United States and Canada, and including dates in Europe, Japan, and Australia. Like the prior tour, the setlist featured Van Halen songs ("Ain't Talkin' 'bout Love", "Hot for Teacher", "Jump", etc.), solo hits ("Goin' Crazy", "Yankee Rose", the aforementioned "Just Like Paradise"), and cover songs ("Just a Gigolo/I Ain't Got Nobody", "California Girls", "You Really Got Me").

Some of the concert highlights included Roth lowering himself onto the stage via rope (like a mountain climber) for the song "Skyscraper", the entire band playing a steel drum line together, the singer climbing up a ladder and singing the song "Panama" from a boxing ring located at the other end of the venue, and riding a surfboard back to the stage during "California Girls". The stage set can be viewed in the performance footage included in the "Just Like Paradise" music video.

The tour included a performance at the Monsters of Rock festival in England, which also included performances by Iron Maiden, Kiss, Megadeth, and Guns N' Roses, among others. This would be the last Roth solo tour to feature Vai in its line-up. 

The opening acts on the North American leg of the tour included Faster Pussycat and Poison at various points. Guns N' Roses was originally supposed to open the first month of the U.S. leg of the tour, but cancelled and was replaced by Faster Pussycat. On the European tour, Poison was announced as opener but cancelled. Among the replacements were Great White and Dutch band Zinatra.

Setlist

 "The Bottom Line"
 "Ain't Talkin' 'bout Love" (Van Halen song)
 "Just Like Paradise"
 "Knucklebones"
 "Goin' Crazy!"
 "Hot for Teacher" (Van Halen song)
 "Easy Street" (Edgar Winter cover)
 "Skyscraper"
 "Hot Dog and a Shake"
 "Just a Gigolo / I Ain't Got Nobody" (Louis Prima cover)
 "Yankee Rose"
 "Panama" (Van Halen song)
 "California Girls" (The Beach Boys cover)
 "You Really Got Me" (The Kinks cover)
 "Jump" (Van Halen song)

Tour dates

References

1988 concert tours
David Lee Roth